The Reason washing machine is an eco friendly design of the washing machine, with an emphasis on ease of use, invented by the architect Andrew Reason.

Launch 

The Reason Washing Machine Kickstarter page claims an increased load capacity of 12 kg as opposed to 10 kg in its previous launch in 2009. Other changes claimed include powered opening and closing of the sliding drum.
The product was originally launched in January 2009, with the slogan "The best washing machine ever made?", and by March 2009 they employed 11 people. The first 200 machines were auctioned on the internet,  and the company aimed to build 100,000 more by the end of 2010. A production line was created to meet demand, which the company anticipated would require 150 people. The company is located in Pembrokeshire, Wales.

References 

Cleaning tools
Laundry washing equipment